The 1989–90 Primera División season was the second category of the Spanish basketball league system during the 1989–90 season. It was the second played with the name of Primera División.

Format 
16 teams played this season.

Regular Season
League of 16 teams in a single group where they play all against all in two rounds.
The last two teams are relegated to Segunda Division.

Promotion playoffs
The top 8 play two knockout rounds for promotion. The first round is the best of 3 matches (first and third matches are played at the home of the best classified in the previous phase) and the second to the best of 5 (first, third and fifth matches are played at the home of the best classified in the phase previous). The two winners go up to the ACB League.

Relegation playoffs
Those classified between the 11th to 14th places play a best of 5 matches (first, third and fifth matches are played at the home of the best classified in the previous phase), the 2 losers go down to Segunda Division.

Teams

Promotion and relegation (pre-season) 
A total of 16 teams contested the league, including 10 sides from the 1988–89 season, one relegated from the 1988–89 ACB, three  promoted from the Segunda División and two Wild Cards.

Teams relegated from Liga ACB
CB Askatuak

Teams promoted from Segunda División
Choleck Llíria
Cirsa Hospitalet
CB Argaray

Wild Cards
Cajahuelva, who obtained a relegation place the previous season.
CB Las Rozas

Teams that resigned to participate
CB Oviedo sold his place to Atlético de Madrid

Venues and locations

Regular season

PlayOffs

Promotion playoffs 

Semifinal winners are promoted to Liga ACB.

Relegation playoffs 

|}

Final standings

References

External links
League at JM Almenzar website
hispaligas.net

Primera División B de Baloncesto
1989–90 in Spanish basketball
Second level Spanish basketball league seasons